Full House Poker is a video game  poker variant Texas hold 'em developed by Microsoft Game Studios and Krome Studios, published by Microsoft Game Studios and was released for Xbox 360 as an Xbox Live Arcade title and Windows Phone 7 on March 16, 2011. The game is the spiritual successor to 1 vs. 100 and features scheduled tournaments known as Texas Heat. Full House Poker also offers TV-style live poker events with season-long tournaments and more traditional Texas Hold Em' matchups with up to 30 human or computer-controlled players.

Reception
Early reviews of the game were positive. TeamXbox gave the game a 7.7/10. Alex Keen of Crave Online praised the Avatar integration, but noted the lack of voice commentary  and experienced a frozen table during a Texas Heat tournament. IGN gave the game an 8/10, praising the game's online mode, while comparing Texas Heat mode to 1 vs 100.

See also
World Series of Poker: Full House Pro

References

2011 video games
Poker video games
Massively multiplayer online games
Microsoft games
Mobile games
Video games developed in Australia
Xbox 360 games
Xbox 360 Live Arcade games
Windows Phone games
Krome Studios games
Multiplayer and single-player video games